A list of horror films released in 2003.

References

Lists of horror films by year
2003-related lists